Lenthionine is a cyclic organosulfur compound found in shiitake mushrooms, onions, and garlic, and it is partly responsible for their flavor. The mechanism of its formation is unclear, but it likely involves the enzyme C–S lyase.

Preparation 
Lenthionine has been isolated from mushrooms by submerging them in water and allowing them to set overnight. The mushrooms were then centrifuged, and dissolved in chloroform, which was later evaporated to form a yellow oil layer. Chromatography was then used to isolated the lenthionine.

Lenthionine has been prepared in situ bubbling hydrogen sulfide gas through a solution of sulfur and sodium sulfide until the pH reached 8. Then, the solution had a large amount of dichloromethane added, and it was stirred at room temperature until an organic layer formed, which contained the lenthionine.

References

Organic disulfides
Pungent flavors
Sulfur heterocycles